Across the Line is a 2015 Canadian drama film directed by Director X (in his feature film directorial debut). The film stars Stephan James and Sarah Jeffery. It is set in Nova Scotia, where it was shot.

Background
The film's storyline was inspired by the 1989 Cole Harbour District High School race riots.

Plot
The film is set in North Preston, Nova Scotia where Mattie (Stephan James), a black hockey player, is being considered for a professional career. However, his hopes are threatened by growing racial strife at his school while his brother Carter (Shamier Anderson) is involved in criminal activity. Mattie also has a romantic interest in Jayme (Sarah Jeffery), who already has a white boyfriend.

Cast
 Stephan James as Mattie Slaughter - Hockey prospect
 Sarah Jeffery as Jayme Crawley - John's girlfriend
 Steven Love as John - Jayme's boyfriend
 Lanette Ware as Velma Slaughter - Mother
 Jeremiah Sparks as Ancel Slaughter - Father
 Shamier Anderson as Carter Slaughter - Older brother
 Denis Theriault as Todd
 Simon-Paul Mutuyimana as Dwight
 Jim Codrington as Fraser Crawley - Father policeman
 Jackie Torrens as Shelley Doucette
 Cara Ricketts as Lori Downey

Production
The film was originally titled Undone. The film was produced by Floyd Kane, Michael Donovan, Mark Gosine and Amos Adetuyi and was written by Kane, a native of East Preston, NS. Kane attended Cole Harbour High school when a race riot erupted at the school in 1989.

Release
The first screening of Across the Line was September 19, 2015 at the Atlantic Film Festival where it won the award for Best Atlantic Feature. The film opened in limited release in British Columbia and Ontario on April 8, 2016, with screenings in various Canadian cities throughout that month.

Reception
The National Post assessed the film at 2.5/4 stars, noting the story's unwavering focus on racial themes was "to the detriment of the film's depth and realism" but noted that video producer Director X "makes the transition to feature film-making look easy".

In 2017, the film was the subject of an episode of The Filmmakers, the Canadian Broadcasting Corporation's web talk series on Canadian film.

References

External links
 
 

2015 films
Canadian drama films
English-language Canadian films
Films directed by Director X
Films shot in Halifax, Nova Scotia
Films set in Nova Scotia
Films about race and ethnicity
Black Canadian films
Hood films
Canadian ice hockey films
2015 directorial debut films
2015 drama films
2010s English-language films
2010s Canadian films